Maryanne Oketch is known for being the winner of the 42nd season of the American reality TV competition series Survivor. In doing so, Oketch became the second Canadian and second Black woman to win the competition series.

Early life
Oketch was born in Germany. Her parents, who are originally from Kenya, immigrated to Canada when she was a child. She attended McMaster University in Hamilton, Ontario, graduating in 2020 with a Bachelor's degree in Integrated Science. She also holds a Master's degree from Tyndale University in Toronto, Ontario.

Survivor
In 2021, Oketch was living in Ajax, Ontario when she got called to participate in the 42nd season of the reality competition series Survivor. The 42nd season of Survivor aired on Global and CBS from March–May 2022.

At the start of the game, Oketch was placed on the Taku tribe. On Day Two, she and two other castaways, Drea Wheeler and Jenny Kim, were each forced to make an individual decision to either risk or protect her next Tribal Council vote, similar to a game of chicken. Those that protected their votes would neither gain nor lose anything, while those that risked their votes would each gain an extra vote, unless all three players risked it, in which case every player would lose her vote at her next Tribal Council. Oketch and Wheeler each selected "risk" while Kim selected "protect," giving Oketch and Wheeler an extra vote each.

On Day Six, Oketch found one of three Beware Idols, which could only be given power through an activation phrase that had to be uttered at the same time as the other two Beware Idols' activation phrases. By Day 11, she and the other two finders of Beware Idols were finally able to activate their idols, as they had all been found. On Night 14, Oketch received two votes at Tribal Council, but Lydia Meredith was sent home with six votes, meaning that Oketch would make it to the merge.

Having received votes at the final pre-merge Tribal Council, Oketch began to feel insecure about her place on the merge tribe. On Day 17, Wheeler was the intended target for elimination at Tribal Council, but she announced that she had an idol which she would be playing for herself. This prompted Oketch to also play her own idol to protect herself that night. The next day, Oketch found another idol, which she managed to keep a secret from the remaining players for the duration of the game.

On Day 23, Jonathan Young was targeted for being a constant threat to win challenges, but Romeo Escobar was also targeted that night. Oketch, however, decided to team up with Escobar in blindsiding Omar Zaheer, and she used her extra vote to tip the results in her favor, eliminating Zaheer by a vote of 3–2–2. Two days later, Escobar won the final immunity challenge and decided to force Mike Turner and Young to compete in a fire-making challenge to determine who would be eliminated right before the Final Three. Escobar's decision effectively gave Oketch a bye into the Finals.

At the Final Tribal Council, Oketch told the jury about her gameplay, showing them the second immunity idol she had found and managed to keep a secret from the rest of the tribe. She also explained her strategy behind eliminating Zaheer at the Final Six, stating that everyone else left in the game at that point would have taken her to the end no matter who won the final immunity challenge. When the final vote took place, Oketch was crowned Sole Survivor by a vote of 7–1–0. She received the vote of everyone on the jury except Young, who voted for Turner to win.

Reception
After the finale of Survivor 42 aired, Oketch received critical acclaim for her gameplay that season.

References

See also
Survivor 42

Canadian people of Kenyan descent
Living people
McMaster University alumni
Participants in American reality television series
People from Ajax, Ontario
Winners in the Survivor franchise
Survivor (American TV series) winners
Year of birth missing (living people)
German people of Kenyan descent